Helfrich is both a surname and a given name. Notable people with the name include:

Surname:
 The Helfrich family of South African cricketers:
 Dudley Helfrich (1912–1980)
 Basil Helfrich (1919–1938)
 Cyril Helfrich (1924–2002)
 Kenneth Helfrich (1927–1982)
 Conrad Emil Lambert Helfrich (1886–1962), Dutch admiral
 Jeff Helfrich (born 1967/68), American politician
 John Helfrich (1795–1852), American pastor and homeopath
 Karl Helfrich, American physical oceanographer
 Mark Helfrich (disambiguation), multiple people
 Theo Helfrich (1913–1978), German racing driver
 Ty Helfrich (1890–1955), American baseball player
 Wolfgang Helfrich (born 1932), German physicist

Given name:
 Helfrich Bernhard Wenck (1739–1803), German historian and educator
 Johann Helfrich von Müller (1746–1830), German engineer